In mathematics, generalized means (or power mean or Hölder mean from Otto Hölder) are a family of functions for aggregating sets of numbers. These include as special cases the Pythagorean means (arithmetic, geometric, and harmonic means).

Definition

(See -norm). For  we set it equal to the geometric mean (which is the limit of means with exponents approaching zero, as proved below):

Furthermore, for a sequence of positive weights  we define the weighted power mean as:

and when , it is equal to the weighted geometric mean:

The unweighted means correspond to setting all .

Special cases 

A few particular values of  yield special cases with their own names:
minimum 
harmonic mean 
geometric mean 
arithmetic mean 
root mean squareor quadratic mean 
cubic mean 
maximum

We can rewrite the definition of  using the exponential function

In the limit , we can apply L'Hôpital's rule to the argument of the exponential function.

By the continuity of the exponential function, we can substitute back into the above relation to obtain

as desired.

Properties

Let  be a sequence of positive real numbers, then the following properties hold:

.
, where  is a permutation operator.
.
.

Generalized mean inequality 

In general, if , then

and the two means are equal if and only if .

It follows from the fact that, for all real ,

which can be proved using Jensen's inequality.

Proof of power means inequality
We will prove weighted power means inequality, for the purpose of the proof we will assume the following without loss of generality:

Proof for unweighted power means is easily obtained by substituting .

Equivalence of inequalities between means of opposite signs
Suppose an average between power means with exponents  and  holds:

applying this, then:

We raise both sides to the power of −1 (strictly decreasing function in positive reals):

Geometric mean
For any  and non-negative weights summing to 1, the following inequality holds:

The proof follows from Jensen's inequality, making use of the fact the logarithm is concave:

By applying the exponential function to both sides and observing that as a strictly increasing function it preserves the sign of the inequality, we get

Inequality between any two power means
We are to prove that for any  the following inequality holds:

Using this, and the Jensen's inequality we get:

Generalized f-mean 

The power mean could be generalized further to the generalized -mean:

Properties of these means are studied in de Carvalho (2016).

Applications

Signal processing
A power mean serves a non-linear moving average which is shifted towards small signal values for small  and emphasizes big signal values for big . Given an efficient implementation of a moving arithmetic mean called smooth one can implement a moving power mean according to the following Haskell code.

powerSmooth :: Floating a => ([a] -> [a]) -> a -> [a] -> [a]
powerSmooth smooth p = map (** recip p) . smooth . map (**p)

 For big  it can serve as an envelope detector on a rectified signal.
 For small  it can serve as a baseline detector on a mass spectrum.

See also
 Arithmetic–geometric mean
 Average
 Heronian mean
 Inequality of arithmetic and geometric means
 Lehmer mean – also a mean related to powers
 Minkowski distance
 Quasi-arithmetic mean – another name for the generalized f-mean mentioned above
 Root mean square

Notes

References and further reading 
 P. S. Bullen: Handbook of Means and Their Inequalities. Dordrecht, Netherlands: Kluwer, 2003, chapter III (The Power Means), pp. 175–265

External links
Power mean at MathWorld
Examples of Generalized Mean
A proof of the Generalized Mean on PlanetMath

Means
Inequalities
Articles with example Haskell code